Ingenuity is the tenth studio album by Ultravox, released in 1994 with Sam Blue as lead vocalist amongst a new five-piece line-up (with Billy Currie the only remaining original member). The album was re-released in 2001 by Puzzle Records with a different cover.

Track listing
All songs written by Sam Blue, Vinny Burns, Billy Currie, Tony Holmes, and Gary Williams.
"Ingenuity" – 4.44
"There Goes a Beautiful World" – 4:10
"Give It All Back" – 4:21
"Future Picture Forever" – 4.17
"The Silent Cries" – 4.14
"Distance" – 3.51
"Ideals" – 4.12
"Who'll Save You" – 6.36
"A Way Out. A Way Through." – 4.07
"Majestic" – 4.18

Personnel
Ultravox
 Sam Blue – lead vocals
 Vinny Burns – guitar
 Billy Currie – keyboards, viola, production
 Tony Holmes – drums
 Gary Williams – bass

References 

1994 albums
Ultravox albums
Intercord albums